Petra Kojdova (born ) is a Czech female volleyball player. She was part of the Czech Republic women's national volleyball team.

She participated in the 2013 FIVB Volleyball World Grand Prix.
On club level she played for SK UP Olomouc in 2013.

References

External links
 Profile at FIVB.org

1993 births
Living people
Czech women's volleyball players
Place of birth missing (living people)
Wing spikers